Paper is a thin, flat material produced by the compression of fibres.

Paper(s) or The Paper may also refer to:

Publishing and academia
 Newspaper, a periodical publication
 Paper (magazine), an American monthly fashion and culture magazine
 The Paper (newspaper), a digital newspaper from Shanghai
 The Paper (American newspaper), a 1960s underground newspaper published in East Lansing, Michigan, United States
 Papers (software), a reference management package
 Scholarly paper, in academic publishing, a work published in a peer-reviewed journal
 Scientific paper
 Term paper, a research paper written by a student as a school assignment

Society, government, and business
 Banknote, or paper money
 Commercial paper, a type of unsecured promissory note
 Document, a physical representation of a body of information
 Legal instrument or legal document
 Identity documents
 Breed registry or pedigreed animal documentation
 Paper (company), an education technology software company
 White paper, an authoritative report by a government or other organization
 Green paper, in Europe, a non-committal report that may lead to a white paper
 Papers (information leaks), a popular term for leaks of financial or governmental data

Popular culture

Film and television
 The Paper (film), a 1994 film directed by Ron Howard and starring Michael Keaton
 Paper (film), a 2010 Turkish film
 The Paper (TV series), an American reality show 
 "The Paper" (SpongeBob SquarePants)
 Novine, a 2016 Croatian TV series translated into English as The Paper by international broadcasters
 Paper, a 2020 Indian web series by Ullu

Music
 Paper (album), an album by Rich Robinson
 "Paper" (Krayzie Bone song), 1999
 "Paper" (Queen Latifah song), 1998
 "Paper" (Svala song), 2017
 "Papers" (song), a 2009 song by Usher
 "Paper", a song by Talking Heads from Fear of Music
 "Paper", a song by Falz from Moral Instruction

Other media
 Yomiko Readman or "The Paper", a fictional character in the Japanese light-novel series Read or Die and related manga and OVA
 Papers, a play by Allan Stratton

Other 
 Precision Array for Probing the Epoch of Reionization (PAPER), a radio telescope
 Facebook Paper, a defunct news portal, released 2014
 Dropbox Paper, a web-based document editing tool, released 2015

See also
 Papier (disambiguation)
 Papër, a village in Albania
 Papar (disambiguation)